Robert "Bob" Emmett Jones Jr. (June 12, 1912 – June 4, 1997) was a member of the United States House of Representatives from the 8th district of Alabama. He was the last to represent that district before it was removed as a result of the 1970 United States Census. Presently there are seven U.S. House districts in Alabama.

Early life

Robert Emmett Jones Jr. was born on June 12, 1912 in Scottsboro, Alabama in Jackson County. He attended public schools and the University of Alabama. He graduated from the University of Alabama law department on January 7, 1937, and was admitted to the bar the same year. His early years saw much legal work in Scottsboro. Jones was elected judge of Jackson County Court in July 1940 then reelected in absentia in May 1945 where he served until October 1946. Jones served in the United States Navy as a gunnery officer in both the Atlantic and Pacific theaters from December 1943 until February 1946.

Congressional career
Jones first entered the United States Congress by special election in 1947 when he was elected as a Democrat to the seat vacated by John Sparkman who had been elected to the U.S. Senate. In 1949, he actively supported the Housing Act of 1949, and played a key role in Section V of the bill which provided money for rural farm housing. He also supported the renewal of the act in 1961. He advocated legislation that led to the Federal Highway Act of 1956, which helped create the modern interstate system. Having been a signatory to the 1956 Southern Manifesto that opposed the desegregation of public schools ordered by the Supreme Court in Brown v. Board of Education, he voted against HR 6127, the Civil Rights Act of 1957. He also voted against the 1960 and 1964 Civil Rights Acts. Jones was an advocate for the economic development of north Alabama, and supported military, NASA, and Tennessee Valley Authority projects in his district. Jones served as Chairman of the House Public Works and Transportation Committee. Jones served 14 consecutive terms until his retirement on January 3, 1977. Jones was not a candidate for reelection in 1976. His papers are housed at the University of Alabama in Huntsville.

Achievements
Among his legislative achievements was his principal sponsorship of the Federal Water Pollution Control Act of 1972. He was also instrumental in passage of the 1965 Appalachian Regional Development Act.

Honors and memorials
Bob Jones High School in Madison, Alabama, is named in his honor, as is the Bob Jones Bridge over the Tennessee River in his native Scottsboro.

After Congress
Jones died June 4, 1997 in Florence, Alabama.

References

External links
 
 Robert E. "Bob" Jones Collection, The University of Alabama in Huntsville Archives and Special Collections

1912 births
1997 deaths
People from Scottsboro, Alabama
Alabama state court judges
American segregationists
United States Navy personnel of World War II
Democratic Party members of the United States House of Representatives from Alabama
20th-century American politicians
United States Navy officers
20th-century American judges